Matthew Bowe (born 13 June 1983) is a British swimming coach and former butterfly swimmer.

Bowe, raised in the Cumbrian village of Silecroft, was British national champion in the 100 metre butterfly. He swam the butterfly leg in England's silver medal-winning  medley relay performance at the 2006 Melbourne Commonwealth Games. In 2007 he represented Great Britain at the World Championships, placing fifth with the medley relay team. He attended Loughborough University and participated in two editions of the World University Games.

Since 2013, Bowe has coached swimming at collegiate level in the United States, most recently with UC Berkeley, where he is the men's associate head coach. Previously he was a senior associate head coach at Ohio State University.

References

External links

1983 births
Living people
British male butterfly swimmers
English male swimmers
Commonwealth Games silver medallists for England
Commonwealth Games medallists in swimming
Medallists at the 2006 Commonwealth Games
Swimmers at the 2006 Commonwealth Games
Competitors at the 2007 Summer Universiade
Competitors at the 2009 Summer Universiade
Alumni of Loughborough University
Ohio State Buckeyes swimming coaches
California Golden Bears swimming coaches
English swimming coaches
Sportspeople from Cumbria